Franquelin is a municipality in Quebec, Canada, in the administrative region of Côte-Nord in RCM Manicouagan.  Its population is 285 people over 430 square kilometres. Franquelin was founded at the foot of Massifs rocks of the Laurentians where impressive cliffs plunge to the Gulf of Saint Lawrence.

The name of the municipality was given in honour of Jean-Baptiste-Louis Franquelin, the first official cartographer of New France. He drew the map of the Saint Lawrence River in 1685.

Franquelin came into existence in 1911 thanks to the forest industry. The lumber would be transported to the rivers by horses. From there, it was shipped to paper mills in Thorold, Ontario, and then to Baie-Comeau starting in 1937. The Ontario Paper Company, owned by Colonel Robert R. McCormick, which later became the Quebec North Shore Paper Co., needed paper to supply the Chicago Tribune and the New York Daily News, which were also owned by McCormick.

Demographics
Population trend:

Private dwellings occupied by usual residents: 157 (total dwellings: 194)

Mother tongue:
 English as first language: 0%
 French as first language: 100%
 English and French as first language: 0%
 Other as first language: 0%

See also 
Franquelin River
Rivière Franquelin Branche Ouest, un cours d'eau, un cours d'eau
Bouchard River
Ma Tante River
Thompson River

References

Incorporated places in Côte-Nord
Municipalities in Quebec